The FIVB Volleyball Women's World Championship is an international volleyball competition established in 1952. It is contested by the women's national teams of the members of Fédération Internationale de Volleyball (FIVB), the sport's global governing body. The tournament has taken place every four years. The most recent World Championship, hosted by Italy in 2014, was won by the United States, who beat China 3–1.

Just like the men's tournament the World Championship final match is the last of the competition, and the result determines which country is declared world champions.

List of finals

 The "Year" column refers to the year the World Championship was held, and wikilinks to the article about that tournament. The wikilinks in the "Final score" column point to the article about that tournament's final game. Links in the "Winners" and "Runners-up" columns point to the articles for the national women's volleyball teams of the countries, not the articles for the countries.

Results by nation

Results by confederation

See also

National team appearances in the FIVB Volleyball Women's World Championship

References

External links
FIVB